Concepts are an extension to the templates feature provided by the C++ programming language. Concepts are named Boolean predicates on template parameters, evaluated at compile time. A concept may be associated with a template (class template, function template, member function of a class template, variable template, or alias template), in which case it serves as a constraint: it limits the set of arguments that are accepted as template parameters.

Originally dating back to suggestions for C++11, the original concepts specification has been revised multiple times before formally being a required part of C++20.

Main uses 
The main uses of concepts are:

 introducing type-checking to template programming
 simplified compiler diagnostics for failed template instantiations
 selecting function template overloads and class template specializations based on type properties
 constraining automatic type deduction

Constraint types and usage 

There are five different places in a function template signature where a constraint can be used (labeled below as C1 to C5):

template<C1 T>
requires C2<T>
C3 auto Fun(C4 auto param) requires C5<T>;

 C1: A type-constraint. This kind replaces class or typename for declaring a type template parameter. When using a concept instead of the former two the type is constraint.
 C2: A requires-clause. Whenever a type-constraint does not work, for example, because the concept takes multiple parameters, a requires-clause can be used to apply more elaborated constraints.
 C3 / C4: A constrained placeholder type. The same syntax is available for placeholder variable aka. auto variable. C++20 added abbreviated function templates which use auto as a placeholder type in the parameter declaration. A constrained placeholder type allows to put constraints on the automatically deduced return type of a function or a variable.
 C5: A trailing requires-clause. This form is similar to C2 with one notable exception. A trailing requires-clause can be applied to a function in a class template. This allows the function to remain a regular, template-free function, which can be enabled or disabled depending on the functions trailing requires-clause.

The constraint forms C1 and C2 can be used in all kinds of templates.

Example: equality_comparable 
The following is a declaration of the concept "equality_comparable" from the <concepts> header of a C++20 standard library. This concept is satisfied by any type T such that for lvalues a and b of type T, the expressions a==b and a!=b as well as the reverse b==a and b!=a compile, and their results are convertible to a type that satisfies the concept "boolean-testable":

// The following concept is an implementation detail used to build equality_comparable
template<typename T, typename U>
concept weakly_equality_comparable_with = requires(const remove_reference<T>& a, const remove_reference<U>& b) {
    { a == b } -> std::same_as<bool>;
    { a != b } -> std::same_as<bool>;
    { b == a } -> std::same_as<bool>;
    { b != a } -> std::same_as<bool>;
};

template<class T>
concept equality_comparable = weakly_equality_comparable_with<T, T>;

A function template constrained on this concept may be declared as follows:

void f(const equality_comparable auto&); // constrained abbreviated function template declaration using a constrained placeholder type (C4 from above)

or 

template <equality_comparable T>
void f(const T&); // constrained function template declaration using a type constraint (C1 from above)

And may be called as usual:

f(42); // OK, int satisfies equality_comparable

Compiler diagnostics 
If a programmer attempts to use a template argument that does not satisfy the requirements of the template, the compiler will generate an error. When concepts are not used, such errors are often difficult to understand because the error is not reported in the context of the call, but rather in an internal, often deeply nested, implementation context where the type was used.

For example,  requires that its first two arguments be random-access iterators. If an argument is not an iterator, or is an iterator of a different category, an error will occur when  attempts to use its parameters as bidirectional iterators:

std::list<int> l = {2, 1, 3};
std::sort(l.begin(), l.end()); 

Typical compiler diagnostic without concepts is over 50 lines of output, beginning with a failure to compile an expression that attempts to subtract two iterators:

In instantiation of 'void std::__sort(_RandomAccessIterator, _RandomAccessIterator, _Compare) [with _RandomAccessIterator = std::_List_iterator<int>; _Compare = __gnu_cxx::__ops::_Iter_less_iter]':
 error: no match for 'operator-' (operand types are 'std::_List_iterator<int>' and 'std::_List_iterator<int>')
 std::__lg(__last - __first) * 2,

[..]

If concepts are used, the error can be detected and reported in the context of the call:

error: cannot call function 'void std::sort(_RAIter, _RAIter) [with _RAIter = std::_List_iterator<int>]'
note:   concept 'RandomAccessIterator()' was not satisfied

Overload resolution 
Concepts can be used to choose function template overloads and class template specializations based on properties of their template arguments, as an alternative to SFINAE and tag dispatching. If an argument satisfies more than one concept, the overload associated with the more constrained concept is chosen.

Type deduction 
Concepts may be used instead of the unconstrained type deduction placeholder  in variable declarations and function return types:

auto     x1 = f(y); // the type of x1 is deduced to whatever f returns
Sortable auto x2 = f(y); // the type of x2 is deduced, but only compiles if it satisfies Sortable

Implementation status 
Concepts TS, as specified in ISO/IEC TS 19217:2015, are implemented as an experimental feature in GCC 6. C++20 concepts are fully implemented in GCC 10, MSVC 19.30, and Clang 10.

History 
A different form of Concepts, popularly known as "C++0x Concepts", was temporarily accepted into the working paper for C++11 but was removed in 2009.

In contrast to this abandoned proposal, the C++20 version of Concepts is sometimes referred to as "Concepts Lite".

During the C++ standards committee meeting in March 2016, the evolution working group moved to merge Concepts into the mainline C++17 standard, but the motion was defeated in full committee.

Concepts v1 was merged into the C++20 draft.

"The One Range" version of Range feature that depend on concepts was also merged into C++20.

See also 
 Concept (generic programming)
 Type class

Notes

References

External links 
 cppreference.com Constraints and Concepts
 

C++
Articles with example C++ code